Samira Ouass (born 22 April 1992) is a Moroccan weightlifter. She competed in the women's 75 kg event at the 2016 Summer Olympics held in Rio de Janeiro, Brazil.

She is also a silver medalist and a two-time bronze medalist at the African Weightlifting Championships.

References

External links
 

1992 births
Living people
Moroccan female weightlifters
Olympic weightlifters of Morocco
Weightlifters at the 2016 Summer Olympics
Place of birth missing (living people)
African Weightlifting Championships medalists
20th-century Moroccan women
21st-century Moroccan women